The green-breasted pitta (Pitta reichenowi) is a species of bird in the family Pittidae. It is one of only two Pitta species in Africa, and is found in deep forest of the tropics.

Description 
The plumage is very similar to that of the African pitta, but the breast is green and the throat is bordered by a black line. Immatures have duller, darker plumage, and a brownish olive breast.

Range 
It is found in Cameroon, Central African Republic, Republic of the Congo, DRC, Gabon, and Uganda. Its natural habitat is subtropical or tropical moist lowland forest.

Gallery

References

External links 
Green-breasted pitta videos on the Internet Bird Collection

Pitta (genus)
Birds of Central Africa
Birds described in 1901
Taxonomy articles created by Polbot